Amanda Tepe (born October 16, 1977) is an American actress.

Tepe is a native of Norwood, Ohio. She has appeared in several short and feature films. Her television credits include General Hospital, Dexter, Studio 60 on the Sunset Strip, Cory in the House, That's So Raven, Entourage and a recurring role on Disney's Wizards of Waverly Place as many different characters. Active in live local theatre, Tepe has performed in various Los Angeles productions, including shows with the Elephant Theatre, McCadden Place Theatre, Whitefire Theatre, ACME Comedy Theatre, and Interact Theatre Company, of which she is a member. She received her Bachelor of Fine Arts in Acting from CalArts and holds a Master of the Arts in Educational Theatre from New York University.

Filmography
 2013: Castle: Monica Lane (1 episode, "The Human Factor")
 2010: Backyard Wedding (TV movie): Marguerite
 2009 - 2012: Days of Our Lives: Joanne Leoni
 Wizards of Waverly Place (2007–2009)
 General Hospital (Colleen McHenry, 2006–2007)
 Dexter
 Cory in the House (2007–2008)
 Studio 60 on the Sunset Strip (Bobbie, 2006 episode)
 Bottoms Up (2006)
 Pulse (2006)
 That's So Raven
 Crazy (2006)
 The Inside
 Entourage
 Iowa (2005)
 Save the Mavericks (2005)
 Framed (2004)
 What I Like About You (2004)
 BachelorMan (2003)
 A Confession (2003)
 Heroine Helen (2001)
 Tachyon: The Fringe (2000)

External links

1977 births
American film actresses
American soap opera actresses
American television actresses
Living people
Actresses from Cincinnati
California Institute of the Arts alumni
Steinhardt School of Culture, Education, and Human Development alumni
21st-century American actresses